The Manthey Barn, in rural Tripp County, South Dakota near Colome, South Dakota, was built in 1916 by George Manthey.  It was listed on the National Register of Historic Places in 2004.

It is a "Midwest Three-Portal" dairy barn.  It has a timber frame built with hand-hewn lumber and uses mortise-and-tenon joinery. Its first floor has mangers on both sides of a narrow central aisle, a milking area, stanchions, and storage areas.  A hayloft is on the second floor.

It is located at 31952 289th St.

Gallery

References

Barns in South Dakota		
National Register of Historic Places in Tripp County, South Dakota
Buildings and structures completed in 1916